Above the Golden State is American Christian rock band Above the Golden State's debut album. Sound Of Your Name was the first single from the album, and I'll Love You So was the second. A music video was made for the song 'Above The Golden State'.

Reception

Above the Golden State received mostly average reviews. Jesus Freak Hideout gave it 3½ out of 5 stars saying it was "nothing groundbreaking" but "still a joy to listen to". Allmusic gave it 4 out of 5, also saying it is familiar, but says it works to their advantage. Christianity Today gave it a negative review, saying it "[has] its moments...but not nearly enough for them to stand out even among the average bands in Christian pop/rock."

Track listing

References

2008 debut albums
Sparrow Records albums
Above the Golden State albums